Irwin Lee Cohen (January 21, 1952 – August 27, 2012) was an American judoka who represented the United States at the 1972 Summer Olympics in Munich, Germany. He won a gold medal at the 1973 Maccabiah Games in Israel, and a silver medal at the 1975 Pan American Games.

Biography
He represented the United States at the 1972 Summer Olympics in Munich, Germany. 
 
At the 1973 Maccabiah Games in Israel, he won the light-heavyweight gold medal, defeating Canadian Olympian Terry Farnsworth. He won silver at the 1975 Pan American Games. 

Irwin Cohen's two sons Aaron and Richard were also accomplished judokas. Aaron in particular was a five-time national champion and three-time bronze medallist at the Pan American Judo Championships.

Irwin Cohen's brother Steve Cohen is a former Olympic Team competitor (1988) and Olympic coach (2000).

Irwin Cohen, who had lived in Buffalo Grove, Illinois, died on August 27, 2012, from amyloidosis and myelodysplastic syndromes.

References

External links 
 

1955 births
2012 deaths
People from Buffalo Grove, Illinois
Deaths from myelodysplastic syndrome
American male judoka
Competitors at the 1973 Maccabiah Games
Jewish martial artists
Jewish American sportspeople
Maccabiah Games medalists in judo
Maccabiah Games gold medalists for the United States
Olympic judoka of the United States
Judoka at the 1972 Summer Olympics
Pan American Games silver medalists for the United States
Pan American Games medalists in judo
Sportspeople from Cook County, Illinois
Judoka at the 1975 Pan American Games
Medalists at the 1975 Pan American Games